Roland Davies may refer to:

Roland Davies (actor) in No Commitments
Roland Davies (comics), writer for Knockout

See also
Rowland Davies (disambiguation)
Roland Davis (disambiguation)